Adapoides is a genus of adapiform primate dating to the Middle Eocene in Asia. It is represented by one species, Adapoides troglodytes.

References

Eocene mammals of Asia
Prehistoric strepsirrhines
Eocene primates
Monotypic prehistoric primate genera
Prehistoric primate genera
Fossil taxa described in 1994